Plasmodium forresteri is a parasite of the genus Plasmodium.

Like all Plasmodium species P. forresteri has both vertebrate and insect hosts. The vertebrate hosts for this parasite are birds.

Description
The parasite was first described by Telford et al. in 1979.

Geographical occurrence
This organism is found in Florida and southern Georgia, United States.

Clinical features and host pathology
This organism naturally infects the following species:
 Eastern screech-owls (Otus asio)
 Great horned owls (Bubo virginianus)
 Barred owls (Strix varia)
 Bald eagles (Haliaeetus leucocephalus)
 Red-shouldered hawks (Buteo lineatus)
 Broad-winged hawks (Buteo platypterus)
 Red-tailed hawks (Buteo jamaicensis)

Experimental infections have been established in the following species:
 Japanese quail (Coturnix japonica)
 Pekin ducks (Anas platyrhynchos)

The only currently known mosquito vector is Culex restuans.

References

forresteri